Peter Bardens (19 June 1945 – 22 January 2002) was an English keyboardist and a founding member of the British progressive rock group Camel. He played keyboards, sang, and wrote songs with Andrew Latimer. During his career, Bardens worked alongside Rod Stewart, Peter Green, Mick Fleetwood and Van Morrison. He recorded eleven solo albums.

Career
Bardens was born in Westminster, London, England, to Marie Marks and Dennis Bardens, the latter a novelist and biographer, and grew up in Notting Hill. He studied fine art at Byam Shaw School of Art, and learned the piano, before switching to the Hammond organ after listening to Jimmy Smith. In 1965, he spent a brief spell with Them after leaving The Cheynes. After leaving Them, he formed a band called The Peter B's, releasing a single, in 1966, called "If You Wanna Be Happy" (b/w "Jodrell Blues"), an instrumental version of the old standard. He moved on and formed Peter B's Looners which eventually morphed into Shotgun Express, a band that played soul music and featured Rod Stewart, Peter Green, and Mick Fleetwood. Fleetwood later said Barden's recruitment into the band kick-started his musical career.

From August 1968 to February 1970, he formed The Village with featured future Elvis Costello and The Attractions bassist Bruce Thomas and Bill Porter (drums). They released a single "Man in the Moon"/"Long Time Coming".

In 1970, Bardens recorded The Answer, an album featuring Peter Green and Andy Gee. Bardens recorded an eponymous album in 1971 which was released in the United States as Write My Name in the Dust before forming Camel in 1972. He left Camel in 1978 to join Them bandmate Van Morrison's band. He recorded Wavelength with Morrison and appeared in the line up of the album's promotional tour. By the end of the 1970s, Bardens began exploring electronica and released the album Heart to Heart in 1979.

Bardens co-wrote "Looking for a Good Time" with Bobby Tench, featured as the B-side of the single "Chain Gang" (1982), which Tench had recorded as a tribute to Sam Cooke. During that era, Bardens also played with the Alan Parsons Project. In 1984, he became a member of Keats (an Alan Parsons Project offshoot) and released an album with them.

In 1985 he recorded the single "Solo" with the band Solo, and in 1986 he produced a Leo Sayer version of the song.

Bardens continued to release a number of solo electronic albums including Seen One Earth (1987), which found chart success in the United States. The first single from the album, "In Dreams", was met with commercial success as well. The song enjoyed heavy airplay on rock stations in the U.S. and Australia, where Triple M Brisbane, the most popular radio station in the country at the time, added it to their playlist. In 1988, he followed this with Speed of Light (1988) which featured Mick Fleetwood. "Gold" from this album was released in the U.S as a single and found some success on MTV.

He released Water Colours in 1991, and Big Sky in 1994. Also in 1994, with his former Camel bandmate Andy Ward and former members of Caravan, he formed the band Mirage for a brief European tour. A subsequent, all-American version of the band, with only Bardens and guitarist Steve Adams from the original line-up, did more touring in 1996.

His last concert, subsequent to being diagnosed with a brain tumour, was in Los Angeles in the summer of 2001. Other performers who joined him at his concert included Mick Fleetwood, John Mayall, John McVie, Sheila E. and Ben Harper.

Bardens died from lung cancer in Malibu in January 2002, at the age of 56, and is interred in the Hollywood Forever Cemetery. A double CD, Write My Name in the Dust: The Anthology 1963–2002, was released after his death and included tracks recorded throughout his career.

Discography

Solo studio albums
1970 – The Answer
1971 – Peter Bardens ('Write My Name in the Dust' in the U.S.)
1976 – Vintage 69
1979 – Heart to Heart
1987 – Seen One Earth
1988 – Speed of Light
1991 – Water Colors
1993 – Further Than You Know
1994 – Big Sky
2002 – The Art of Levitation
2005 – Write My Name In The Dust: The Anthology 1963–2002

Solo singles
1971 – "Homage to the God of Light"
1987 – "In Dreams"
1988 – "Gold"
1988 – "Whisper in the Wind"
1991 – "A Higher Ground"

Studio albums with Them
The Angry Young Them (1965)

Studio albums with Van Morrison
Wavelength (1978)

Studio albums with Camel
Camel (1973)
Mirage (1974)
The Snow Goose (1975)
Moonmadness (1976)
Rain Dances (1977)
Breathless (1978)
The Single Factor (1982) (guest)

Live albums with Camel
Greasy Truckers Live at Dingwalls Dance Hall (1974) (Camel + Various Artists. Includes 19-minute version of Camel's 'God of Light Revisited''')A Live Record (1978) (live, various venues 1974, 1975, 1977)Pressure Points: Live in Concert (1984) (live, 11 May 1984, Hammersmith Odeon, London, UK)On the Road 1972 (1992) (live, venue unspecified)Gods of Light '73-'75 (2000) (live, various venues'')

Single with the band Solo
"Solo" (1985)

References

External links
 

1945 births
2002 deaths
Burials at Hollywood Forever Cemetery
Camel (band) members
Canterbury scene
Deaths from lung cancer in California
English rock keyboardists
English rock pianists
English organists
British male organists
People from Westminster
Them (band) members
Mirage (British band) members
20th-century male musicians
Progressive rock keyboardists
Shotgun Express members